Pitcairnia crassa is a plant species in the genus Pitcairnia. This species is endemic to Bolivia.

References

crassa
Flora of Bolivia